Nehzatabad (also Romanized as Nehz̤atābād) is a village in Kheybar Rural District, Choghamish District, Dezful County, Khuzestan Province, Iran. At the 2006 census, its population was 515, in 97 families.

References 

Populated places in Dezful County